The 1968 NBA playoffs was the postseason tournament of the 1967–68 season of the National Basketball Association (NBA). The tournament concluded with the Eastern Division champion Boston Celtics defeating the Western Division champion Los Angeles Lakers, 4 games to 2 in the NBA Finals.

The Celtics won their 10th NBA title, their first under player-coach Bill Russell after Red Auerbach's retirement.

In the Eastern Division Finals, the Celtics became the first team in NBA history to rally from a 3–1 series deficit to win, as they knocked off the defending champion Philadelphia 76ers in seven games. In the West, the Lakers swept the San Francisco Warriors in four games.

It was the first time since 1954 that the top team in a division failed to make the Division Finals; from 1955 to 1966, the league gave the regular-season division champion a first-round bye. This year also marked a change in that the Division Semifinals were changed from a best-of-five to a best-of-seven.

Bracket

Division Semifinals

Eastern Division Semifinals

(1) Philadelphia 76ers vs. (3) New York Knicks

This was the sixth playoff meeting between these two teams, with the 76ers winning three of the first five meetings as the Syracuse Nationals.

(2) Boston Celtics vs. (4) Detroit Pistons

This was the first playoff meeting between these two teams.

Western Division Semifinals

(1) St. Louis Hawks vs. (3) San Francisco Warriors

 Jeff Mullins hits the game-winner.

 Final game for the Hawks before moving to Atlanta.

This was the third playoff meeting between these two teams, with the Warriors winning the first two meetings.

(2) Los Angeles Lakers vs. (4) Chicago Bulls

This was the first playoff meeting between these two teams.

Division Finals

Eastern Division Finals

(1) Philadelphia 76ers vs. (2) Boston Celtics

 The Celtics become the first team in NBA playoff history to come back from a 3–1 series deficit.

This was the 12th playoff meeting between these two teams, with the Celtics winning six of the first 11 meetings.

Western Division Finals

(2) Los Angeles Lakers vs. (3) San Francisco Warriors

This was the second playoff meeting between these two teams, with the Warriors winning the first meeting.

NBA Finals: (E2) Boston Celtics vs. (W2) Los Angeles Lakers

This was the sixth playoff meeting between these two teams, with the Celtics winning the first five meetings.

See also
1968 NBA Finals
1967-68 NBA season

References

External links
Basketball-Reference.com's 1968 NBA Playoffs page

National Basketball Association playoffs
Playoffs

fi:NBA-kausi 1967–1968#Pudotuspelit